Norman Coburn (born 6 March 1937) is an Australian former actor and playwright best known for his television serial and soap opera roles. He started his early career in theatre, film and television in the United Kingdom in the late 1950s.

Coburn became famous as High School English teacher, Deputy/headmaster Donald Fisher in the early years of soap opera Home and Away, as one of 16 original cast members, he appeared from the pilot episode in 1988 until 2003, and reprised the character making brief sporadic returns between 2004 and 2007. Coburn retired in 2008, with the exception of a rare TV series appearance in 2019 with Home and Away co-star Debra Lawrence.

Early life
Coburn was born in Sydney, New South Wales, Australia  and trained with the Australian Elizabethan Theatre Trust in North Sydney, Australia, before travelling to Britain in the 1950s to pursue an acting career. He appeared briefly in iconic British TV shows such as Dixon of Dock Green and Coronation Street. He quit acting for a time and worked as a restaurateur in London before moving to Cornwall in the south west of the country. Here he owned a vineyard and was involved in converting BBC ventriloquist and artist Francis Coudrill's studio in St Ives into The Mermaid Seafood Restaurant. After being in Cornwall for a number of years in the 1970s, he returned to Australia in the early 1980s and decided to take on acting roles again, one of which, would be the role of Donald Fisher in soap opera Home and Away.

Career
Coburn is best known for his portrayal of Donald Fisher, the principal of Summer Bay High School, in the Australian soap opera Home and Away. He appeared from the show's pilot episode in 1988 until 2003. Coburn was featured in the Guinness World Records as the longest serving actor in an Australian serial, along with co-stars Ray Meagher and Kate Ritchie. Since his departure from Home and Away, he has returned in consecutive guest appearances, the last being in 2007.

In 2014, 11 years after leaving Home and Away, he was featured in a photo shoot for New Idea, in a reunion with former cast members Nicolle Dickson  who played his daughter Bobby, Ross Newton (Greg) and Ryan Clark who played his grandson.

Coburn has also appeared briefly in guest roles in soap opera including  The Young Doctors, A Country Practice, Sons and Daughters, Special Squad,  The Hollowmen and Rosehaven.

Personal life
Coburn originally resided in Perth, and later Brisbane, Queensland. He currently resides on Bruny Island, and located off the south-eastern coast of Tasmania, Australia. His daughter Nana Coburn, (born 28 September 1971) is an actress best known her two roles as Vicki Baxter and Lisa Matthews on Home and Away.

Filmography

Theatre
sourced from AusStage

References

External links
 

1937 births
Australian male soap opera actors
Living people
Male actors from Sydney
20th-century Australian male actors